Shin Ji-soo (born October 28, 1985) is a South Korean actress and singer. Shin began her entertainment career as a child actress, and has since starred in television dramas such as Virtue (2000) and Famous Princesses (2006), as well as the film The Hero (2013). In addition to acting, Shin also became part of the three-member K-pop girl group D.Heaven in 2010.

Filmography

Television series

Film

Music video

Variety show

Discography

Awards and nominations

References

External links
 Shin Ji-soo Fan Cafe at Daum 
 
 
 
 
 

1985 births
Living people
South Korean child actresses
South Korean television actresses
South Korean film actresses
Hanyang University alumni